Technorama may refer to:

Technorama, Swiss technical museum and science center
line of panoramic photography cameras from Linhof